, officially code-named CV02, are a pair of Vocaloid software developed by Crypton Future Media, headquartered in Sapporo, Japan. Their official moe anthropomorphism consists of a pair of twin vocals, a boy and a girl, respectively named Len and Rin. They use Yamaha Corporation's Vocaloid 2 and Vocaloid 4 singing synthesizing technology. Their voices are samples of the voice actress Asami Shimoda. They have performed at live concerts together, as they are each other's mirror image.

Their official code name, CV02, refers to their position as the second Vocaloids made by Crypton Future Media for their "Character Vocal Series" (abbreviated "CV Series"), succeeding Hatsune Miku (code-named CV01) and preceding Megurine Luka (code-named CV03). Notice the number 02 on Rin's left shoulder in her official artwork.

Development
Rin & Len were developed by Crypton Future Media using Yamaha's Vocaloid 2. Their voices were created by taking vocal samples from voice actress Asami Shimoda at a controlled pitch and tone. They were the second release within the "Character Vocal Series," (abbreviated "CV Series") which included Crypton Future Media's other vocaloids, Hatsune Miku and Megurine Luka. Rin was the first to be illustrated and Len was made to match her, following Crypton's concept.

They received mixed results from producers because compared to Hatsune Miku, they were considered much harder vocals to use. Asami Shimoda noted that she often received comments from Vocaloid fans that Rin's voice echoes within their head and makes them feel dizzy, while Len's higher ranges were not favored by those not fond of the pair entirely.

Despite being released as a masculine character, during the development of VY2, the vocals of Ryuto or Len were not classified as "masculine vocals" and were not considered capable of holding a low masculine tones because of it. As a result, he and Ryuto were not referenced in the development of VY2.

Additional software
Due to a number of complaints and issues with the original vocal, it was replaced with the "ACT2" package. This package acted independently from the original package. It addressed issues regarding their ability to vocalize clearly. People who purchased the old version were able to claim the updated disc until 20 September 2008.

In 2010 after Hatsune Miku Append was released for Hatsune Miku, Kagamine Rin & Len Append was released for Rin & Len. Rin's appends are "Power," "Warm," and "Sweet" while Len's appends are "Power," "Cold," and "Serious."

An update, Kagamine Rin/Len V4X, was released for Vocaloid 4 on December 24, 2015. This package contains six Japanese vocals, three for Rin and three for Len. They are updates on the old 
Append vocals from Vocaloid 2. Rin's vocals are "Power E.V.E.C.," "Warm" and "Sweet" while Len's are "Power E.V.E.C.", "Cold" and "Serious." Enhanced Voice Expression Control (E.V.E.C.) is a new system developed for Piapro Studios which allows delicate changes to how phonetic sounds sound. There are two options for the E.V.E.C. vocals: "Power" and "Soft." All Rin and Len vocals can use the new Cross-Synthesis (XSY) system developed for Vocaloid 4, though are limited to only being able to do so with other vocals of their assign character of "Rin" or "Len". Rin and Len each received an English vocal which was released on the same day as the Japanese vocal. These vocals are available separately as a download or as a bundle with the Japanese vocals.

Marketing
20,000 copies were sold on initial release. The Kagamine Append package was released and went straight to fifth place in December 2010, the day of their release.

Characteristics
During development, Crypton's initial concept was to make a pair of female and male vocals. The first idea of this concept was twin voices of a girl and her mirror image of opposite gender. Crypton Future Media had the intention to distribute them as twins, but this idea was not adopted and their relationship was left unconfirmed.

After seeing many works that depict their relationships differently, Crypton announced on a magazine interview that those would meet their ideal. Crypton's final announcement was that they are neither siblings nor lovers. They have been depicted as twins in popular songs just as they have been depicted as lovers in other popular songs. Examples of this include "Story of Evil" or "Servant of Evil" by Mothy where they are depicted as twins, as well as "Feathers Across the Seasons" by Hitoshizuku-P x Yama where they are depicted as a married couple. Both have been featured in official media; Story of Evil was featured at Mikupa 2011 in Sapporo while Feathers Across the Seasons was featured in Miku Symphony 2018–2019.

Merchandise companies such as Goodsmile will use "twin" in their description of the characters on some products or not use the descriptor in other products. Crypton's official website advertises the two as "powerful and charming twin vocals". The reference is in the vocals however, and not the characters themselves.

During Vocaloid 2 Append production, Wataru Sasaki described them as having one soul between the two of them, having only one append shared, POWER.

For their appends, Wataru wanted them to have a sense of transparency with their design. In clarification to what he meant by this, he stated the "transparency" was in reference to their hearts.

For the V4x design, Rin was given a more silver/whiter look to make her appearance more refreshing. The design also was based more on the EOS B700 rather than the Kx5 because of it more whiter appearance. More synthesizer base music symbols were used in addition.

References

External links
 Official website 

Vocaloids introduced in 2007
Fictional singers
Japanese idols
Japanese popular culture
Music software

sv:Vocaloid#top